Tanner Alexander Scott (born July 22, 1994) is an American professional baseball pitcher for the Miami Marlins of Major League Baseball (MLB). He made his MLB debut with the Baltimore Orioles in 2017.

Amateur career
Scott graduated from Howland High School in 2012. He then played college baseball at Notre Dame College in 2013 and Howard College in 2014. After the 2014 season, he briefly played collegiate summer baseball with the Chatham Anglers of the Cape Cod Baseball League. He was drafted by the Baltimore Orioles in the sixth round of the 2014 Major League Baseball draft.

Professional career

Baltimore Orioles 
After signing, Scott made his professional debut with the Gulf Coast Orioles and spent the whole season there, going 1-5 with a 6.26 ERA in ten games (eight starts). In 2015, Scott pitched for both the Aberdeen IronBirds and Delmarva Shorebirds, where he posted a combined 4-3 record and 3.83 ERA in 42.1 innings pitched between the two clubs. After the season, he pitched in the Arizona Fall League. Scott spent 2016 with both the Frederick Keys and the Bowie Baysox, where he went 5-4 with a 4.76 ERA in 43 relief appearances between the two teams. In 2017, he played with Bowie where he compiled a 0-2 record and 2.22 ERA in 24 starts before being called up to the major leagues on September 17, 2017. Scott made two appearances for Baltimore for the season.

2018 
Scott worked regular one-inning stints for the Orioles during spring season, creating speculation that the Orioles No. 6 prospect could pitch his way onto the major league roster early. The plan, however, was for Scott to pitch three-inning stints as a starter in five-man rotation for the Norfolk Tides. Orioles manager Buck Showalter says of the decision:

Scott's been learning control on his fast ball, while developing his slider as an out pitch. As Schowalter notes, "he's not tripping that 100 [mph] or anything. It's more about control of himself as much as the baseball." Of pulling back on the velocity of his "high-90s" fastball in favor of location, Scott says:

After pitching out of the bullpen in Triple-A Norfolk's opening game on April 6, 2018, Scott was called up again on April 8, 2018 to join the Orioles bullpen — just as Jimmy Yacabonis was optioned to Norfolk. Showalter said on Scott's return:

Scott was optioned back to Norfolk on April 9, after pitching 1.2 innings against the Yankees the day before — when he recorded five outs. He was recalled on April 20 prior to a Friday game against the Cleveland Indians. Infielder Engelb Vielma was optioned back to Norfolk in a corresponding move. Scott pitched two scoreless innings against the Indians the next day before being optioned once again on April 28. Baltimore recalled him on May 9.  The up/down process continued on June 9 when the O's sent Scott down only to recall him on June 15.

In 53 appearances in the season, Scott worked in  innings, striking out 76 in the process.

2019 
Scott appeared in 28 games only and posted an ERA of 4.78 in  innings with 37 strikeouts.

2020 
In 2020 for the Orioles, Scott pitched to a superb 1.31 ERA to go along with 23 strikeouts in  innings pitched over 25 games.

2021 
In 2021, Scott recorded a 5.17 ERA with 70 strikeouts and 37 walks in 54 innings.

Miami Marlins 
On April 3, 2022, Scott was traded along with Cole Sulser to the Miami Marlins in exchange for a draft pick, two minor league prospects, Antonio Velez and Kevin Guerrero, and a player to be named later. (On June 3, Baltimore acquired minor league RHP Yaqui Rivera from Miami as the player to be named later).

On January 13, 2023, Scott agreed to a one-year, $2.825 million contract with the Marlins, avoiding salary arbitration.

References

External links

1994 births
Living people
People from Warren, Ohio
Baseball players from Ohio
Major League Baseball pitchers
Baltimore Orioles players
Miami Marlins players
Howard Hawks baseball players
Gulf Coast Orioles players
Aberdeen IronBirds players
Delmarva Shorebirds players
Peoria Javelinas players
Frederick Keys players
Bowie Baysox players
Norfolk Tides players
Chatham Anglers players